Errol Leonard Norstedt (17 June 1948–17 January 2002), better known by his stage name Eddie Meduza, was a Swedish composer and musician working mainly in the rockabilly genre.

Music career

Themes and behaviour
Many of Meduza's songs are about alcohol, women, and cars, often with obscene lyrics. Some songs are politically oriented, with many aimed against the various Swedish governments in power during his musical career.

One of Meduza's personas was the vulgar E. Hitler. In this guise he generally recorded more offbeat recordings like "E.Hitler skiter" (a recording of his own bowel movements) and sexually explicit material. The E. Hitler recordings were only available on tape by mail order directly from Meduza. On tour, he urged his audience to drink vodka to become as drunk as he was during his performances, to the tune of his "Mera brännvin" ("More booze").

Meduza also recorded serious rockabilly songs with a distinct 1950s flavour in his own studio, called Studio Ronka (from runka, Swedish for male masturbation similar to English wank). He played most of the instruments himself. He often got bad reviews from the press, notably from Expressen journalist Mats Olsson, to which Meduza replied by writing songs such as "Kuken står på Mats Olsson" ("Mats Olsson has a hard-on"), "Mats Olsson är en jävla bög" ("Mats Olsson is a damn fag") and "Mats Olsson runkar kuken" ("Mats Olsson wanks his cock"). He reportedly said that no matter what he did it was never good enough for the critics.

Meduza is also remembered for the first recorded appearance of future hair metal guitarist John Norum (Dokken, UFO, Europe), who played on two of his albums.

Albums
Errol Norstedts' first album was Errol, released in 1975 under his real name. This album consists mostly of dansband music, but also includes a humorous song called "Snus-kig Blues" about snus. He began calling himself Eddie Meduza in 1978 with the release of the single "Punkjävlar" ("Punk bastards"). His first album as Eddie Meduza was released in 1979, called Eddie Meduza & Roarin' Cadillacs, mostly consisting of rock and roll and ballads in English.
In 1980, Meduza released his next album, Garagetaper, with a front cover a parody of the cover for Frank Zappa's 1979 album Joe's Garage. Meduza's breakthrough came in 1981 with the album Gasen I Botten, which includes some of his more well-known songs like "Mera Brännvin" and "Volvo".

Alcoholism and death
According to Meduza, he developed alcoholism in the early 1980s during periods of intense touring. In 1981, he was convicted of drink-driving and spent one month in prison. Nevertheless, he continued drinking heavily, and a year after his release, he suffered a nervous breakdown. In 1993 he collapsed on his way to perform at a concert and was diagnosed with ventricular hypertrophy (enlarged heart). He was warned by doctors that he would die if he drank again, and initially made major changes to his lifestyle, stopped drinking and started working out. However, in the late 1990s, suffering a worsening depression, he started drinking heavily again, and this caused his health to deteriorate further. On 17 January 2002, Meduza died of a heart attack at his home in Småland in southern Sweden, aged 53. He was cremated and his ashes scattered, in the summer of 2003, outside Rossö in Kosterfjorden, Bohuslän. He is survived by his wife and children.

Popularity in Mexico
Meduza's song "Reaktorn läck i Barsebäck" ("The reactor leaking in Barsebäck") from the 1980 album Garagetaper has become popular in Mexico, under the title "Himno a la banda".

Discography

Albums
 1975 – Errol
 1979 – Eddie Meduza & Roarin' Cadillacs
 1980 – Garagetaper
 1981 – Gasen I Botten
 1982 – För Jævle Braa!
 1982 – 21 Värsta!!!
 1983 – Dåren É Lös
 1984 – West a Fool Away
 1985 – Ain't Got No Cadillac
 1986 – Collection (2 LP)
 1989 – Dom Dåraktigaste Dumheterna Digitalt (Röven 1)
 1989 – Dom Dåraktigaste Dumheterna Digitalt (Röven 2)
 1990 – På Begäran
 1990 – You Ain't My Friend
 1991 – Collection (CD)
 1995 – Harley Davidson
 1997 – Silver Wheels
 1998 – Värsting Hits
 1998 – Eddie Meduzas Bästa
 1999 – Väg 13
 1999 – Dance Mix
 1999 – Alla Tiders Fyllekalas Vol. 1
 1999 – Alla Tiders Fyllekalas Vol. 2
 1999 – Alla Tiders Fyllekalas Vol. 3
 2000 – Alla Tiders Fyllekalas Vol. 4
 2000 – Alla Tiders Fyllekalas Vol. 5
 2000 – Alla Tiders Fyllekalas Vol. 6
 2001 – Scoop
 2001 – Alla Tiders Fyllekalas Vol. 7
 2001 – Alla Tiders Fyllekalas Vol. 8
 2001 – Alla Tiders Fyllekalas Vol. 9
 2002 – Just Like An Eagle
 2002 – Alla Tiders Fyllekalas Vol. 10
 2002 – Alla Tiders Fyllekalas Vol. 11
 2002 – Alla Tiders Fyllekalas Vol. 12
 2003 – Live(s)! CD+DVD
 2003 – 100% Eddie Meduza
 2003 – Live(s)! CD
 2004 – Rock'n Rebel
 2005 – Alla Tiders Fyllekalas Vol. 13
 2005 – Alla Tiders Fyllekalas Vol. 14
 2005 – Alla Tiders Fyllekalas Vol. 15
 2005 – Alla Tiders Fyllekalas Vol. 16
 2005 – Raggare
 2006 – Dragspelsrock
 2006 – Dubbelidioterna
 2010 – Rockabilly Rebel
 2014 – En Jävla Massa Hits
 2014 – Jag Och Min Far (with Anders Norstedt)
 2016 – The Lost Tape

Cassettes
 1976 – E. Hitler & Luftwaffe: Mannen Utan Hjärna
 1977 – E. Hilter & Luftkaffe Nr. 1
 1977 – E. Hitler & Luftwaffe Nr. 2
 1979 – E. Hitler & Luftwaffe Nr. 3 Del 1
 1979 – E. Hitler & Luftwaffe Nr. 3 Del 2
 1980 – Greatest Hits
 1983 – Greatest Hits I
 1983 – Greatest Hits II
 1983 – Dubbelidioterna
 1984 – Eddie Meduza Presenterar Lester C. Garreth
 1985 – Hej Hitler!
 1985 – Legal Bootleg (cassette box consisting of "Första Försöken", "Fortsättning Följer", "Mera Material", "Svensktoppsrulle", "Fräckisar" and "Bonnatwist")
 1986 – Raggare
 1986 – Collection Del 1
 1986 – Collection Del 2
 1987 – Greatest Hits
 1987 – Jag Blir Aldrig Riktigt Vuxen, Jag!
 1987 – E. Hitler På Dansrotundan
 1987 – Börje Lundins Julafton
 1988 – Radio Ronka 1
 1988 – Börje Lundins Kräftkalas
 1988 – Dårarnas Julafton
 1989 – Idiotlåtar
 1989 – Dårarnas Midsommarafton
 1990 – Radio Ronka 2
 1993 – Jubelidioterna
 1994 – Eddies Garderob
 1994 – Kräftkalas Två
 1995 – Hjärndelirium 2000
 1996 – Radio Abonnerad
 1996 – Rockligan
 1996 – Rätt Sorts Råckenråll
 1996 – Scanaway
 1996 – God Jul Era Rövhål
 1997 – Di Värsta Pärvärsta Scetcherna
 1997 – Di Värsta Pärvärsta Låtarna
 1997 – Göran Persson Är En Galt
 1998 – Compendia Ultima (cassette box, consisting of 11 collection cassettes)

Singles
 1975 – Tretton År / Här Hemma
 1978 – Punkjävlar / Oh What A Cadillac
 1979 – Yea Yea Yea / Honey B
 1979 – Såssialdemokraterna / Norwegian Boogie / Roll Over Beethoven
 1981 – Volvo / 34:an
 1981 – Gasen I Botten / Mera Brännvin
 1982 – Han Eller Jag, Vem Ska Du Ha / Tonight
 1982 – Jätteparty I Kväll / Tonight
 1982 – Sverige / Stupid Cupid
 1983 – Fruntimmer Ska En Ha...
 1983 – Fruntimmer Ska En Ha... / Han Eller Jag, Vem Ska Du Ha?
 1983 – Jag Vill Ha En Brud Med Stora Bröst / Leader of the Rockers
 1983 – Jag Vill Ha En Brud Med Stora Pattar / Leader of the Rockers
 1984 – Sveriges Kompani (Militärpolka) / Dunder Å Snus
 1984 – Punkar'n Å Raggar'n / Hej På Dig Evert
 1984 – Fisdisco / California Sun
 1985 – The Wanderer / It's All Over Now
 1988 – Småländsk Sommarnatt / Birds And Bees
 1990 – Sweet Linda Boogie / Heart Don't Be A Fool
 2015 – Julesång / Ute På Vischan
 2016 – Midsommarnatt / Mera Brännvin

Critiscm
Eddie Meduza has been critized for making songs with themes that were innapropriate (e.g his song "Jag bara runkar" [English "I am just jerking off"]) which led to him getting banned from big newspapers like Aftonbladet.

See also
 Könsrock
 List of Swedes in music

External links
Official Web page 
John-Johns fan-site 
Eddies himmel

References 

1948 births
2002 deaths
Singers from Gothenburg
Swedish songwriters
Swedish rockabilly musicians
Alcohol-related deaths in Sweden